The Western Front is a 2000 book by Richard Holmes about the western front of the First World War. Kirkus Reviews called it a "concise, balanced study".

References

History books about World War I